Charley Scalies is an American actor best known for his portrayal of Thomas "Horseface" Pakusa, one of the stevedores and union members on the second season of HBO's The Wire. He also appeared in Season 5 of The Sopranos as Coach Molinaro. Other shows include Homicide: Life on the Street and Law & Order. He lives with his wife in Pennsylvania. He is the father of five children and the grandfather of four.

Filmography

Film

Television

References

External links 

Male actors from Philadelphia
Living people
Year of birth missing (living people)